Court Martial is a 2020 Indian Hindi-language web drama film directed by Sourabh Srivastava. The film stars Rajeev Khandelwal, Saksham Dayma and Swapnil Kotiwar in the main lead roles. The film script was based on the teleplay written by Swadesh Deepak in the 1980s. The film follows the role of Bikash Roy who is an extremely sharp minded defensive lawyer goes into deep ideology to bring the shocking revelation and truth behind the brutal assault of a senior army officer by a junior ranked army personnel. The film is set on the backdrop of military court. The film was released on ZEE5 on 6 May 2020.

Plot 
Sawar Ramchander is being court martialed for killing his senior officer and injuring another officer, Captain B. D. Kapoor. 

The story is about the truth of why did Ramchander do this, and Defence Lawyer Captain Bikash Roy proves it slowly and steadily. Captain Kapoor belongs to upper caste while Ramchander belongs to a lower class. All army complain from the soldier to the CO (Commanding Officer) is done to a Subedar who passes on the complain. In this case Subedar Balwaan Singh knew that Captain Kapoor used to call Ramchander  filthy names and dishonor him with being the servant of Mr. Kapoor's house. On the day the killing, Ramchander is insulted again saying "your mother must be sleeping with a high class person", he lost his cool and the incident happened. In between the hearing at the court Captain Kapoor has many time lost control and has shown a lot of hatred towards the guard at the duty, who he things is inferior to him. Also while being questioned by the Defence Lawer Captain Roy he has picked up his hand to hit him and Captain Kapoor's wife has called him an animal/beast as he has beaten her up. A the of the film Captain kapoor lost control once again and got into a scuffle with the guard on duty and during the scuffle Captain Kapoor is shot in the chest. So it being said what you sow is what you will reap and the guard was let go as it wasn't his fault.

Cast 
 Rajeev Khandelwal as Defence Lawyer Captain Bikash Roy
 Saksham Dayma as Captain B. D. Kapoor aka Bhikari Das Kapoor
 Govind Pandey as Col. Suraj Singh, Chief of Judges for this Court Martial
 Swapnil Kotriwar as Sawar Ramchander
 Bhagwan Tiwari as Prosecution Lawyer Major Ajay Puri
 Navin Tyagi as Lt Col Rajendra Rawat, Commanding Officer
 Saroj Parida as Capt Dr. Gupta
 Ram Ashish Mishra as Subedar Balwaan Singh

References

External links 
 

Drama films based on actual events
2020s Hindi-language films
2020 direct-to-video films
2020 drama films
Hindi-language films based on actual events
Indian drama films
Indian films based on actual events
ZEE5 original films
Hindi-language drama films